SWI/SNF-related matrix-associated actin-dependent regulator of chromatin subfamily E member 1 is a protein that in humans is encoded by the SMARCE1 gene.

Function 

The protein encoded by this gene is part of the large ATP-dependent chromatin remodeling complex SWI/SNF, which is required for transcriptional activation of genes normally repressed by chromatin. The encoded protein, either alone or when in the SWI/SNF complex, can bind to 4-way junction DNA, which is thought to mimic the topology of DNA as it enters or exits the nucleosome. The protein contains a DNA-binding HMG domain, but disruption of this domain does not abolish the DNA-binding or nucleosome-displacement activities of the SWI/SNF complex. Unlike most of the SWI/SNF complex proteins, this protein has no yeast counterpart.

Interactions 

SMARCE1 has been shown to interact with Estrogen receptor alpha, SMARCB1 and SMARCA4.

References

Further reading